The following is a list of communities in the United States where the English language is not the majority language spoken at home according to data from the 2000 Census.

The list contains 151 communities in 12 states, involving the indigenous languages Yupik, Inupiaq, Navajo, Apache, Hopi, Havasupai-Hualapai, Pima, Malecite-Passamaquoddy, Choctaw, Crow, and Keres, as well as Indo-European languages Russian, Spanish, French, and Yiddish. Spanish is spoken in the most communities where English is not the majority language spoken at home, Navajo is the most spoken indigenous language out of listed communities. Arizona is the most diverse state regarding this field, with 6 other languages being the most spoken. There are 6 states with only 1 language listed, 4 of these relating to the Spanish language, 1 relating to the Choctaw language, and 1 relating to the Crow language.

Alaska

Arizona

California

Florida

Maine

Mississippi

Montana

New Jersey

New Mexico

New York

Texas

Utah

See also
 Language education in the United States
 Language Spoken at Home
 List of multilingual presidents of the United States
 Muhlenberg legend

References

English as a second or foreign language
Lists of populated places in the United States